Halgerda nuarrensis is a species of sea slug, a dorid nudibranch, a shell-less marine gastropod mollusk in the family Discodorididae.

Distribution

Etymology
This species was named in honor of Nuarro EcoLodge in recognition of their research support for the first author (Yara Tibiriçá) and conservation efforts.  Nuarro is also the local name for the blow hole near the bay where the type specimen was collected

References

Discodorididae
Gastropods described in 2018